Paagal Premi is a 2007 Indian Odia-language film directed by Hara Patnaik and stars Sabyasachi Mishra and newcomer Arpita Mukherjee. This is a remake of Telugu hit movie Arya (2004). The film released to positive reviews and made Sabyasachi Mishra an overnight star.

Plot 
Surya (Sabyasachi Mishra) and Gitanjali (Arpita) are smart college students. Surya falls in love with Gitanjali at first sight. Ajay (Sukanta) is a spoilt brat and is the son of local M.L.A. Abinash (Pradyumna Lenka). Ajay likes Gitanjali and thus proposes to her. When Gitanjali refuses, Ajay threatens that he will jump from the college roof top. Being a meek girl, Gitanjali accepts the proposal and starts dating Ajay.

Meanwhile, Surya proposes to Gitanjali. In the presence of Gitanjali's boy friend, Ajay, Gitanjali refuses. But Surya doesn't yet to give up on her as he feels that Gitanjali doesn't love Ajay truly. Surya tries to impress Gitanjali sincerely without creating a rift between the two. The film is all about how Surya tries to win Gitanjali with his attitude and positive out look.

Cast

 Sabyasachi Mishra   as Surya
 Arpita Mukherjee as Gitanjali
 Sukanta as  Ajaya
 Pradyumna Lenka  as M.L.A Abinash
 Saroj Dash
 Chaitali
 Debjani
 Alok Roy
 Tapas Sargharia
 Nimananda
 Niranjan Pati
 Koyel Das
 Sonali
 Hara Patnaik
 Abhinayasri as an item number in "Aa Mane Anandapur"

Production 
Sabyasachi Mishra was offered the lead role after he was spotted by Hara Patnaik at a stage show. Kolkata-based Arpita Mukherjee made her debut with this film.

Soundtrack 
The songs were composed by Manmatha Misra who reused all the songs from the original.

Accolades
Sabyasachi Mishra won the Best Actor Award from the Orissa State Film Awards in 2007.

References

External links
 

2007 films
Odia remakes of Telugu films
Indian romantic comedy films
2007 romantic comedy films
2000s Odia-language films
2000s masala films
Films directed by Hara Patnaik